Elgeyo-Marakwet County is one of Kenya's 47 counties. Elgeyo Marakwet County is located in the former Rift Valley Province. Its capital and largest town is Iten. It borders the counties of West Pokot to the north, Baringo County to the east, southeast and south, Uasin Gishu to the southwest and west, and Trans Nzoia to the northwest.

Demographics 
The total population of Elgeyo-Marakwet County is 454,480 persons, of this 227,317 are females, 227,151 males and 12 intersex persons. There are 99,861 households in the county with an average size of 4.5 persons per household with a density population of 150 persons per square km.

Geography, geology and topography 

The Kerio River binds the county on the eastern side. From its alluvial plain the topography gradually rises towards the west. The Elgeyo Escarpment stands out distinctly and causes elevation differences of up to 1,500 m. In the northern and southern part of the county the topography is rugged, giving way to more subdued relief differences going westwards. The underlying geology mainly consists of gneisses from the Basement System. The Cherangany Hills rise gently to form the western half of the Great Rift Valley and extend northwest in a broken chain to Mount Moroto in Uganda. Non-volcanic in origin, the Cherangany Hills resulted from subsequent erosion of the raised western ridge of the Eastern Rift Valley. Many of the summits are covered with huge groundsels and lobelias. Some of the hills include Kameleogon (3581 m), Chebon (3375 m), Chepkotet (3370 m), Alaleigelat (3350 m) and Sodang (3211 m).

Climate 
Temperatures range from a minimum of 12 °C which is extremely cold with mists and even frost to some extent to a maximum of 22 °C. Rainfall ranges annually from 800 to 2300 mm High above sea level.⁵

Religion and ethnicity 

The county is mainly occupied by Keiyo, Sengwer also called Cherangany and Marakwet are part of the larger ethnic grouping of eight culturally and linguistically related ethnic groups known as the Kalenjin.Marakwet is a sub-tribe of the Kalenjin. It is made up of the sub-dialects Almoo, Endoow, Markweta (the sub-dialect giving rise to the common name), and Sombirir (Borokot) who presently predominantly live in Marakwet District in the North Rift Valley Province. Some now live in Trans Nzoia East and Uasin Gishu North districts and in other towns.The name Keiyo or Elgeyo has been used interchangeably to describe the Keiyo people. The latter name is disputed as a corruption of the true name, which was coined by the Uasin-Gishu Maasai, who were the Keiyo's neighbours in the mid-9th century at the western side of Eldoret.

Administrative and Political Units 
Elgeyo - Marakwet is divided into 4 sub-counties, 20 county assemblies wards, 68 locations and 199 sub-locations.
Below is the distribution of the county assemblies wards.

Source

County government 
Wisley Rotich who succeeded Alex Tolgos is the current County Governor. He is currently serving his first term as governor. William Kisang is the current (2022) senator elect to replace Kipchumba Murkomen who was appointed to be Cabinet Secretary for Roads. and County Women Representative is Caroline Jeptoo Ng'elechei, all of the United Republican Party, an affiliate of the Jubilee Alliance. The county has four constituencies in the National Assembly, and twenty ward seats in its County Assembly. The Speaker was Albert Kochei.

County Executive Committee 

Source

County Ward Representatives

Health 
There are a total of 129 health facilities in the county with an averages of 3.7 km access distance from one health centre to another. The county has 626 medical personnel cutting across different of medical profession.

Transport and Communication 
The is covered with 292.1 km of earth, 1,415.3 km of murram and 92.2 km of bitumen. As at 2014 there were 8 postal offices across the county with 1,600 installed letter boxes, 1,112 rented letter boxes and 488 vacant letter boxes.

Economy 
Economic activity in the county is characterized by mixed farming, which consists mainly of livestock and subsistence farming. Other activities include small business, tourism and fluorspar mining in Kerio Valley. Oil Prospecting by Tullow Oil Company is ongoing in Kerio Valley.

As at 2014 county had 62,190,000 cattle, 7,220,000 goats and 10,232,000 sheep.

Tourism 
Major Tourist Attractions are

Education systems 
There are a total of 554 ECD centres, 418 primary schools and 112 secondary schools, 4 public technical and vocational colleges and 1 teacher training college in the county. 

Source

Health

Sports

Major sports activity 
The county is notable for its long-standing tradition of producing top athletes who have represented Kenya in many international athletics events.

Notable sport personalities 
Notable Athletes hailing from this county include;

Important towns 
EMC Towns

Eminent people

Services and urbanisation

See also
Kabarak
West Pokot County
Baringo County
Uasin Gishu County
Trans Nzoia County

References

External links
Kenya Open Data County Data Sheet

 
Counties of Kenya